The Dunaway House is an historic house at 2022 Battery in Little Rock, Arkansas.  Designed in the Craftsman Style, it is located on a boulevard on Battery Street. The two-story brick house is in the Central High School Neighborhood Historic District. It was designed by architect Charles L. Thompson of Little Rock in 1915. The Dunaway House features a terra-cotta gable roof with a portico over an arched entrance. It has a south-facing two-story wing with a hip roof.

The house was listed individually on the National Register of Historic Places in 1982.

References

Houses on the National Register of Historic Places in Arkansas
Houses completed in 1915
Houses in Little Rock, Arkansas
Terracotta
National Register of Historic Places in Little Rock, Arkansas
Historic district contributing properties in Arkansas